New rave (also typeset as nu-rave, nu rave or neu rave) is a genre of music described by The Guardian as "an in-yer-face, DIY disco riposte to the sensitive indie rock touted by bands like Bloc Party." It is most commonly applied to a British-based music scene between 2005 and late 2008 of fast-paced electronica-influenced indie music that celebrated the late 1980s Madchester and rave scenes through the use of neon colours and using the term 'raving' to refer to going nightclubbing.

Use of term
The British music magazine NME is largely responsible for popularising the term throughout 2006 and 2007, until claiming in mid-2008 reviews that "New Rave is over". The genre has connotations of being a "new" version of music heard at raves, as well as being a play on the term "new wave".

Aesthetics
The aesthetics of the new rave scene are similar to those of the original rave scene, being mostly centred on psychedelic visual effects. Glowsticks, neon and other lights are common, and followers of the scene often dress in extremely bright and fluorescent colored clothing. New Rave has been defined more by the image and aesthetic of its bands and supporters, than by its music. Trash Fashion lead singer, Jet Storm, and Electro heroine Uffie, have been described as the scene's very own pin ups. Nevertheless, the use of electronic instruments, a musical fusion of rock and dance styles, and a particular anarchic, trashy energy are certainly key elements.

Origins

Klaxons, Trash Fashion, New Young Pony Club, Hadouken!, Late of the Pier and Shitdisco are generally accepted as the main exponents of the genre (although some of them disavow the term entirely).

The term was coined by Klaxons founder Jamie Reynolds. Klaxons later declared they were not new rave, describing it as a "joke that's got out of hand". In reaction to the media overkill of the "genre", Klaxons banned the use of glowsticks at their gigs in April 2007, saying that "We kept getting asked to explain it. The whole idea of new rave was to take the piss out of the media by making them talk about something that didn't exist, just for our own amusement. And they'd say, I appreciate that, but can you tell me more about new rave?" Los Angeles Times critic Margaret Wappler comments that the "minimalist dance-punk of LCD Soundsystem, the analog classicism of Simian Mobile Disco, the fanatical electro-thrash of Justice, the international amalgam of M.I.A., the agitated funk of !!! (Chk Chk Chk) and the art-schooled disco-sleaze of Cansei de Ser Sexy" contributed to the thriving 'new rave' dance scene, which led to a rediscovery of indie rockers, and a critical and intellectual revolution in dance music.

Criticism
The sound of the original rave style is barely (if at all) discernible (save some typical analog synth lines) in the majority of bands referred to as new rave. Bands such as The Sunshine Underground, CSS (Cansei de Ser Sexy) and Hot Chip are often labeled as new rave due to their large following by fans of the genre. M.I.A. has been described as "a new raver before it was old." Several have publicly declared they had nothing to do with the genre. Stylist Carri Mundane described it as funny, saying New Rave was "Vacant in retro. It’s just a marketing machine.... I guess it was a fun time but I’m more excited about what happens now. The next level - the next generation. There’s a mood of neo-spiritualism and futurism that excites me."

The belief that many of the bands associated with new rave can more appropriately be associated with the genre of dance-punk has given credence to such suggestions, although differences between both genres are said to be minor and more down to aesthetics. Critic John Harris has stated in The Guardian newspaper that the genre is nothing more than a "piss-poor supposed 'youthquake'" that will soon go out of fashion in the same way as rave.

See also
 Rave

References

External links
"Rave Dog" - a documentary about Trash Fashion and new rave on the Channel 4 (UK) programme FourDocs

Electronic dance music genres
British styles of music
British rock music genres
2000s in music
2010s in music
Alternative dance